Felechas is a locality located in the municipality of Boñar, in León province, Castile and León, Spain. As of 2020, it has a population of 36.

Geography 
Felechas is located 55km northeast of León, Spain.

References

Populated places in the Province of León